Sandalolitha is a genus of cnidarians belonging to the family Fungiidae.

The species of this genus are found in Indian Ocean, Malesia and Pacific Ocean.

Species:

Sandalolitha boucheti 
Sandalolitha dentata 
Sandalolitha robusta

References

Cnidarians